This is a list of all foreign players in the Finnish Veikkausliiga, which commenced play in 1990. The following players must meet both of the following two criteria:

 Have played at least one Veikkausliiga regular season game. Players who were signed by Veikkausliiga clubs, but only played in playoff stages, lower league, cup and/or European games, or did not play in any competitive games at all, are not included.
 Are considered foreign, i.e., outside Finland determined by the following:

A player is considered foreign if his allegiance is not to play for the national team of Finland.
More specifically,
 If a player has been capped at international level, the national team is used; if he has been capped by more than one country, the highest level (or the most recent) team is used. These include Finnish players with dual citizenship.
 If a player has not been capped at international level, his country of birth is used, except those who were born abroad from Finnish parents or moved to Finland at a young age, and those who clearly indicated to have switched his nationality to another nation.
Clubs listed are those for which the player has played at least one Veikkausliiga game – and seasons are those in which the player has played at least one Veikkausliiga game. Note that a Veikkausliiga season is same as the calendar year.

In bold: players still active in Veikkausliiga and their respective teams in current season.

Afghanistan  

 Fareed Sadat – FC Lahti, AC Oulu – 2016–18, 2021
 Jabar Sharza – HIFK – 2019–20

Albania  
 Donaldo Açka – FC Haka – 2021–
Albion Ademi – FC Inter, PS Kemi, IFK Mariehamn – 2016–20 
Ansi Agolli – VPS – 2007–08
Hysen Memolla – KPV – 2019
Ridvan Zeneli – RoPS, FF Jaro, HJK – 1996–98, 2002–05

Algeria  
 Farid Ghazi – HJK – 2006–07
Mohamed Khezrouni – Atlantis FC – 2001
Nacer Mohamed Medjoudj – HJK – 2007
Yacine Slatni – AC Oulu – 2007
Kheireddine Zarabi – TPS – 2007–08
Billal Zouani – Atlantis FC – 2001

Andorra  

 Marc Vales – SJK – 2016–18

Angola  
 Antonio Correia – FC Inter – 2008
Igor Nascimento – FC Haka – 2005

Argentina  

 Luciano Álvarez – FC Inter – 2001–04
 Rodrigo Arciero – SJK – 2021
 Maxi Asís – FC Inter – 2012
 Luciano Balbi – FC Inter – 2019
 Daniel Bazán – FC Inter – 2002–03
 Samuel Cappa – FC Inter – 2000
 Martín Civit – FC Inter – 2009
 Diego Corpache – FC Inter, FC Haka – 2001–09
 Pablo Cortizo – FC Inter – 2013
 Luis Alberto Cuenca – FC Jazz – 1996
 Fernando Della Sala – FC Inter – 2000–03
 Gastón Escudero – FC Jazz – 2000
 Gabriel Flores – FC Inter – 2000–02
 Carlos Fondacaro – FF Jaro – 2014
 Lucas Garcia – FC Honka, PK-35 Vantaa, FC Inter – 2014, 2016–18
 Emmanuel Ledesma – SJK – 2020–21
 Michael López – AC Oulu – 2022–
 Pedro Massacessi – FC Jazz – 1997
 Favio Orsi – FC Jazz – 1997
 Pablo Parmo – FC Inter – 2001, 2003–04
 Raúl Peralta – FC Inter – 2000
 Arístides Pertot – FC Inter, Tampere United, TPS – 2000–09
 Pibe – FC Inter – 2021
 Sebastián Rusculleda – PS Kemi – 2018
 Federico Scoppa – FC Inter – 2011
 Luis Solignac – IFK Mariehamn – 2013–14
 Mario Vargas – TPS – 1996
 Claudio Verino – FC Inter – 2009

Armenia  

 Alexander Tumasyan – FF Jaro – 2013–14
 Valeriy Voskonyan – VPS – 2019
 Yvan Yagan – IFK Mariehamn – 2020

Australia  

 Mark Byrnes – FC Hämeenlinna – 2004
 Jacob Esposito – PS Kemi – 2018
 Peter Makrillos – IFK Mariehamn – 2020
 Dylan Murnane – IFK Mariehamn, HJK – 2018–19, 2021
 Levent Osman – Tampere United – 2002
 Jordan Simpson – FF Jaro – 2008
Brandon Wilson – SJK – 2021

Austria  

 Johannes Kreidl – KuPS – 2016, 2021–
Manuel Martic – HJK – 2022–
 Stefan Umjenovic – KPV – 2019
Aleksandar Vucenovic – FC Haka – 2021

Azerbaijan  

 Cem Felek – RoPS – 2017
 Elkhan Hasanov – TPS, KTP – 1997, 1999–2000 
 Vyacheslav Lychkin – TPS – 1997

Bangladesh  
Tariq Kazi – Ilves – 2018–19

Belarus  

 Aleksandr Gridyushko – RoPS – 1993 
 Anatoli Koksharov – TP-47 – 2005 
 Valeri Tsyganenko – TP-47 – 2005 
 Vitali Varivonchik – FF Jaro – 1998

Belgium  

 Dickson Agyeman – FF Jaro, TPS – 2011–12
 Hosine Chebaïki – AC Allianssi – 2005
 Mustapha Douai – AC Allianssi – 2005
 Grégory Goffin – AC Allianssi – 2005
 Floribert Ngalula – TPS – 2011

Bosnia and Herzegovina  

 Bahrudin Atajić – SJK – 2015
 Ermin Gadžo – IFK Mariehamn – 2011–12
 Nedim Hiros – IFK Mariehamn – 2005
 Toni Markić – KuPS – 2014–15
 Vilim Posinković – RoPS – 2015
 Velibor Pudar – TPV – 1999
 Ivan Sesar – FC Inter – 2018
 Saša Stević – FF Jaro, IFK Mariehamn – 2005–07
 Anes Zukić – MyPa – 2004

Brazil  

 Ademir – HJK – 2015
 Adriano – Atlantis FC, AC Allianssi, MyPa – 2001–06
 Agnaldo – RoPS – 2018–19
 Alan Henrique – FC Inter, IFK Mariehamn – 2017, 2021
 Alex – FC Hämeenlinna – 2002
 Allan – SJK – 2015
 Anderson – FC Kuusysi – 1994–95
 Andrey Almeida – FC Inter – 2010
 Batista – SJK – 2019
 Jefferson Batista – Finnairin Palloilijat – 1996
 Felipe Benevides – MyPa – 2009–10
 Betinho – TP-Seinäjoki – 1997
 Bigu – Finnairin Palloilijat – 1998
 Bonilha – FC Lahti – 2016
 Jean Carlos de Brito – TPS – 2020
 Marcelo Cardoso – FC Jazz – 1994
 Carlos Henrique – FF Jaro – 1994
 Cleiton – MyPa – 2009
 Vini Dantas – FC Lahti – 2013
 Davi Rancan – FC Inter – 2010
Dé – IFK Mariehamn – 2021–
 Deco – FC Lahti – 1999
 Dema – Tampere United, HJK, FC Haka, MyPa – 2010–12, 2014
 Denis – FF Jaro – 2014–15
 Diego Assis – IFK Mariehamn – 2013–16
 Diogo – FC Inter – 2014–15
 Dionísio – FC Jazz, TPV, Tampere United – 1993–95, 2000–01
 Douglas Caé – VPS – 2018
 Édson – FC Haka – 1992
 Eduardo – FC Jazz – 1998
 Erikson Carlos – HIFK, KTP – 2019–21
 Ethie – AC Oulu – 2010
 Euller – FC Lahti – 2016
 Fábio – FC Jazz – 2001
 Julio Fernandes – IFK Mariehamn – 2018
 Fernando Abreu – IFK Mariehamn – 2011
 Vinicius Frasson – MyPa – 2011
 Ricardo Friedrich – RoPS – 2015–16
Gabriel Bispo – KuPS – 2022–
 Marcelo Grandi – TPV – 1995
 Jair – Ilves, HJK – 2019– 
 Jeferson Pires – FC Jazz, RoPS – 2001, 2009
 João Batista – FC Lahti – 1999
 Jorge Luís – FC Jazz – 1996
 Jorginho – PS Kemi – 2018
 Julinho – FC Jazz – 2000
 Kassiano – MyPa – 2014
 Lucas Kaufmann – PK-35 Vantaa, FC Honka – 2016, 2018–
 Klauss – HJK – 2018
 Leandro – FF Jaro – 1994
 Leandro Motta – MyPa, FC Lahti – 2014–15
 Liliu – FC Inter – 2020
 Lucas Morais - AC Oulu - 2022–
 Luciano – Ilves, FC Kuusysi, FC Lahti – 1992, 1994–95, 1999
 Luis Fernando – FC Viikingit, SJK – 2007, 2014
 Luis Henrique – HIFK, HJK, FC Honka – 2019–21
 Luiz António – FC Jazz, HJK, MyPa – 1992, 1994–96, 1998–2003
 Gladson Macan – FC Honka – 2014
 Gustavo Manduca – HJK – 1998
 Marco Manso – MyPa – 1999–2003, 2005–07
 Marcelo – FC Inter – 1996–97
 Marcio – FC Lahti – 2006
 Márcio Lima – TPS – 2013
 Marcos Túlo – FC Jazz – 1992
 Marcus Vinicius – SJK – 2018
 Marquinhos – FC Jazz – 1998
 Matheus Alves – FC Lahti – 2015
 Murilo – SJK, HJK – 2020– 
 Muller – Kemi Kings – 2016
 Nadson – SJK – 2019
 Neno – FC Kuusysi – 1994
 Oliveira – HJK – 2005
 Renan Oliveira – FC Inter – 2014
Pablo Andrade – SJK – 2022–
 Paolo – Ilves – 1993
Paulo Ricardo – KuPS – 2021–
 Pedro Vitor – KuPS – 2020
 Stéfano Pinho – MyPa – 2014
 Piracaia – FC Jazz, HJK, KTP, Atlantis FC, FC Hämeenlinna, FF Jaro – 1992–2004, 2005–07
 Marco Pogioli – FC Jazz, FC Haka, KuPS – 1997–2003
 Rafael – HJK, FC Jazz, FC Lahti – 1997–2000, 2005–10, 2012–16
 Rafinha – AC Oulu, Tampere United, HJK – 2007–11, 2016–19, 2021–
 Laercio Ramos Junior – FC Inter – 2007
 Rangel – KuPS – 2018–21
 Reginaldo – FF Jaro – 2015
 Bernardo Ribeiro – IFK Mariehamn – 2013–14
 Marcello Ribeiro – FC Hämeenlinna – 2004
 Robério – AC Allianssi – 2004
 Robert – FC Jokerit – 1999
 Dennys Rodrigues – AC Oulu – 2010
 Igor Rodrigues – FC Lahti – 2003
 Romualdo – Ilves – 1993
 Rudinei – FC Jazz – 2001
Sávio Roberto – HIFK – 2022–
 Stenio – FC Lahti – 2017–18
 Tadeu Terra – MyPa – 2011
 Toró – HIFK – 2019
 Francisco Torres – MyPa – 2011
 Rodrigo Vaz – FC Jazz, HJK, FC Lahti, Tampere United – 1993–2003
 Victor Luiz – HJK – 2019
 Vitinho – HIFK – 2020

Bulgaria  

 Kiril Aleksandrov – FF Jaro – 2005
 Vasil Banov – TPV – 1999
 Sergei Dimitrov – TPV – 1999
 Spas Gigov – RoPS – 2005
 Angel Ginev – FF Jaro – 2004–06
 Strati Iliev – TPV, FC Jokerit, FC Jazz – 1999–2001
 Nikolai Markov – Lahden Reipas – 1991
 Borislav Panov – Lahden Reipas – 1991

Burkina Faso  

 Aristide Bancé – HJK – 2014

Cameroon  

 Anatole Abang – SJK – 2017
 Alain Bono – KuPS – 2011
 Alain Didier-Six – FC Jokerit – 2001
 Alain Richard Ebwelle – VPS, IFK Mariehamn, KTP – 2019–21
 Titi Essomba – AC Oulu, RoPS – 2007–08
 Gael Etock – JJK, FC Lahti – 2017, 2019
 Jacques Haman – Ilves – 2019
 Jean Marie Dongou – FC Honka – 2020–21
 Daniel Kamy – FC Inter – 2018–19
 Jean Didi Kima Beyissa – TPV – 1999
Patrick Loa Loa – Ilves – 2021– 
 Marcel Mahouvé – FC Inter – 2004
 Tabi Manga – KuPS, Ilves – 2018–
 Alfred Mapoka – TP-47 – 2005
 Eric Matoukou – FC Inter – 2015
 Alim Moundi – Ilves, TPS – 2018, 2020
 Marc Ndikumade – TP-47 – 2005
 Sammy Ndjock – RoPS – 2020
 Serge N’Gal – FC Inter – 2004–05, 2015
 Jean Nganbe Nganbe – AC Oulu, FC Lahti, VPS, RoPS – 2010, 2013–16
 Ariel Ngueukam – FC Lahti, SJK, Ilves, KuPS – 2012–17, 2019–21
Pierre-Daniel Nguinda – KTP – 2021
MacDonald Niba – KuPS – 2021
Taddeus Nkeng – HJK – 2021
 Marius Noubissi – Ilves – 2017–18
 Alex Nyom – RoPS – 2011
 Patrice Ollo – VPS, RoPS, KuPS – 2007–11
 Etchu Tabe – RoPS, KuPS – 2011–13

Canada  

 Nana Attakora – FC Haka – 2012
 Andrew Barsalona – VPS – 2014
 Hanson Boakai – FC Inter – 2019
 Tomer Chencinski – VPS, RoPS – 2011, 2015
 Michael Cox – KuPS – 2014
 Jamar Dixon – FF Jaro – 2015
Yann Fillion – AC Oulu, IFK Mariehamn – 2021–
 Tyler Hemming – Tampere United – 2008
 Frank Jonke – AC Oulu, FC Inter, FF Jaro – 2011–13
 Ben McKendry – TPS – 2018
 David Monsalve – FC Inter – 2009–10, 2016
 Riley O’Neill – MyPa – 2011–12
 Tosaint Ricketts – MyPa – 2009–10
 Roger Thompson – IFK Mariehamn – 2013–14
 Charlie Trafford – IFK Mariehamn, TPS, KuPS, RoPS – 2013–15, 2017
 Mason Trafford – IFK Mariehamn – 2010–12
 Jon Viscosi – TPS – 2018

Cape Verde  

 Josimar Lima – FC Lahti – 2018
 David Silva – FF Jaro – 2015

Central African Republic  

 Sterling Yatéké – TPS – 2018

Chile  

 Pablo González – RoPS – 2017
Josepablo Monreal – SJK – 2022–
Diego Rojas – SJK – 2022–

China  
 Gao Leilei – MyPa – 2007

Colombia  

 Juan Algería – FC Honka – 2020–21
Jean Carlos Blanca – Ilves – 2021 
Eliécer Espinosa – TPS – 2020 
Stiwar García – KuPS – 2018 
Julián Guevara – PS Kemi, FC Inter – 2017–18 
Aldayr Hernández – TPS, HIFK, FC Honka – 2020– 
Hernán Luna – Ilves – 2021 
Yessy Mena – KPV – 2019 
 Alfredo Morelos – HJK – 2016–17
Luis Carlos Murillo – KuPS, HJK – 2018–21
William Parra – HJK – 2019
Edwin Salazar – PS Kemi – 2017
Róger Torres – Ilves – 2021
Cristian Valencia – SJK – 2021–
 Eduar Zea – PS Kemi – 2017

Costa Rica  

 Brian Span – IFK Mariehamn – 2015–17

Croatia  

 Domagoj Abramović – FC Inter – 2008, 2011
Andrija Bosnjak – FC Haka – 2021
 Mate Dujilo – IFK Mariehamn – 2009–10
 Dejan Godar – RoPS – 2004–05
 Igor Jovanović – TPS, FF Jaro, FC Lahti – 2009–10, 2013–14, 2017–18
 Ante Šimunac – IFK Mariehamn – 2009–10
 Vinko Soldo – KuPS – 2019

Curaçao  
 Angelo Cijntje – KuPS – 2001 ( while active)

Cyprus  

 Marios Nikolaou – FC Inter – 2016

Czech Republic  

 Filip Hlupik – IFK Mariehamn – 2017
 Rostislav Jerabek – FC Haka – 1993
 Miroslav Karas – FC Haka – 1993–95
 Miloslav Kufa – FC Jokerit – 2000
 David Zoubek – FC Jokerit – 2003

Denmark  

 Lars Andersen – Finnairin Palloilijat – 1996
 Christian Andreasen – TPS – 2009
 Lars Dalsborg – TPS – 1992
 Klaus Granlund – HJK – 1990
 Riffi Haddaoui – Finnairin Palloilijat, PK-35 – 1996, 1998
 Tammy Haddaoui – Finnairin Palloilijat – 1996
 Morten Jörgensen – TP-Seinäjoki – 1997
 Kenneth Knudsen – IFK Mariehamn – 2007
 Leif Nielsen – Finnairin Palloilijat – 1996
 Allan Olesen – IFK Mariehamn – 2011
 Simon Azoulay Pedersen – TPS – 2008
 Michael Törnes – HJK – 2014

Dominican Republic  

 Luiyi de Lucas – FC Haka – 2020–21

Ecuador  
 Jhon Cagua – FC Haka – 2009

Egypt  

 Sherif Ashraf – HJK, FF Jaro – 2012
 Adel Eid – HJK – 2005
 Amr Gamal – HJK – 2018
 Elsaid Maher – HIFK – 2019
 Abdallah Said – KuPS – 2018
 Omar Rabie Yassin – RoPS – 2011

El Salvador  

 Víctor Merino – FC Jazz – 1999–2001
 Víctor Turcios – RoPS – 2013

England  

 Tomi Ameobi – VPS – 2013
 Hakeem Araba – PS Kemi – 2018
 Gavin Bailey – Mikkelin Palloilijat – 1996
 Stewart Beards – RoPS, TPS – 1991–94
 Scott Beeks - IFK Mariehamn
 Michael Belfield – Lahden Reipas, FC Kuusysi, FC Haka, PK-35 – 1990–95, 1998
 Scott Boden – IFK Mariehamn – 2008
 Alex Brister – FC Honka – 2014
 Jordaan Brown – VPS – 2014
 Wayne Brown – TPS, SJK – 2009, 2013–15
 Matt Carmichael – TPS – 1996
 Chris Cleaver – FF Jaro, AC Allianssi, TPS – 2002–05, 2007–10
 Philip Daley – TPS – 1996
 Craig Dean – TP-47 – 2005
 Darrell Duffy – MyPa – 1993
 Malcolm Dunkley – RoPS – 1990
 Stuart Douglas – RoPS – 2004
 Mark Dziadulewicz – Ilves, FC Oulu – 1990–92
 Jordan Eagers – IFK Mariehamn – 2008
 David Elliot – KPV, FF Jaro, RoPS – 1990, 1992–96
 Derek Fazackerley – Kuusankosken Kumu – 1990
 Ryan Gilligan – Kemi Kings – 2016
 Neville Gordon – HJK – 1996
 Marlon Harewood – FC Haka – 1998
 Robert Haworth – TPS – 1996
 Gary Hyde – Kuusankosken Kumu – 1990
 Billy Ions – Kemi Kings, SJK – 2016–20
 Steven Irwin – FF Jaro – 2012
 Lee Isaac – FC Inter – 1996–97, 1999
 Darren Jackson – MyPa – 1996
 Jake Jervis – SJK – 2020–2022
 George Lawrence – Mikkelin Palloilijat – 1992
 Christopher Lee – RoPS – 1996
 Andrew Lewis – KTP – 2015
 Rob Milsom – TPS – 2010
 Josh Mulvany – KTP – 2015
 Jordan Mustoe – SJK – 2018
 David Moore – MyPa, TPV – 1996, 1999
 Mark Nangle – TP-Seinäjoki – 1997
 Jake Nicholson – MyPa – 2011
 Alex Nimely – FC Honka – 2018
 Danny O’Brien – SJK – 2018
 Liam O’Neil – VPS – 2012
 Kudus Oyenuga – MyPa – 2011
 Kyle Patterson – TP-47 – 2005
 Steven Polack – RoPS, FC Inter – 1990–94, 1996–97
 Owen Price – TPS – 2007
 Darren Purse – IFK Mariehamn – 2013
 Connor Ruane – FC Inter – 2019–20
 Mark Salmon – RoPS – 1996
 Kaine Sheppard – SJK – 2017
 Anton Smith – TP-47 – 2005
 Gus Sow – FC Honka – 2014
 Paul Taylor – KuPS – 1994
 Paul Tisdale – Finnairin Palloilijat – 1998
Calum Ward – HIFK, AC Oulu – 2021–
 Kevin Ward – Mikkelin Palloilijat – 1996
 Kim Wassell – HJK – 1995
 Ben Webster – MyPa – 2009
 Jason White – KPV – 1990
 David Wilson – RoPS, FC Haka, HJK – 1993, 1999–2002

Equatorial Guinea  

 Baba Issaka – FC Jokerit – 2001

Estonia  

 Mihkel Aksalu – SJK – 2014–19
 Henri Anier – FC Lahti – 2017–18
 Argo Arbeiter – KTP – 1999–2000
 Andrei Borissov – FF Jaro – 1998
 Artjom Dmitrijev – FC Lahti – 2018
 Trevor Elhi – SJK – 2019
 Maksim Gussev – KPV – 2019
 Markus Jürgenson – VPS – 2017
 Urmas Kaljend – Ilves – 1993
 Marek Kaljumäe – PS Kemi – 2017–18
 Toomas Kallaste – FF Jaro, KTP – 1999–2000
 Gert Kams – SJK – 2014
 Kevin Kauber – TPS – 2014
 Tarmo Kink – SJK – 2016
 Urmas Kirs – KTP – 1999–2000
 Artur Kotenko – FF Jaro – 2012
 Marko Kristal – FC Lahti – 2000
 Toomas Krõm – FF Jaro – 1998
 Aleksandr Kulik – RoPS – 2008
 Kert Kütt – FC Haka – 2012
 Liivo Leetma – KTP – 2005–06
 Brent Lepistu – FC Lahti – 2019
 Meelis Lindmaa – TPV, KTP – 1999
 Maksim Lipin – PS Kemi – 2018
 Marko Meerits – VPS – 2017–18
 Sergei Mosnikov – PS Kemi – 2017
 Konstantin Nahk – FC Jokerit – 2003
 Tarmo Neemelo – MyPa – 2008
 Raivo Nõmmik – MyPa – 1998
 Jevgeni Novikov – FF Jaro – 2010
 Henrik Ojamaa – RoPS – 2011
 Hindrek Ojamaa – JJK, VPS – 2017–19
 Maido Pakk – FC Haka – 2009
 Artur Pikk – KuPS – 2020
 Mart Poom – KuPS – 1992
 Albert Prosa – RoPS, TPS – 2016, 2018
 Sander Puri – KuPS – 2012
 Ats Purje – FC Inter, KuPS – 2008–09, 2012–14, 2017–20
 Taavi Rähn – FF Jaro – 2013
 Lembit Rajala – KTP – 1999
 Martin Reim – KTP – 1999–2000
 Mikk Reintam – JJK – 2011–13
 Urmas Rooba – TPS, FF Jaro – 2007–09
 Vitali Teles – FF Jaro – 2009–11
 Sergei Terehhov – FC Haka, FC Honka – 2002–04, 2006
 Andreas Vaikla – IFK Mariehamn – 2017
 Vjatšeslav Zahovaiko – KuPS – 2012
 Indrek Zelinski – FC Lahti – 2000

Ethiopia  
 Fikru Tefera – KuPS – 2011

France  

 Plaisir Bahamboula – MyPa – 2013
 Richard Barroilhet – VPS – 2011
 David Bitsindou – Kemi Kings – 2016
 Olivier Boumelaha – IFK Mariehamn – 2005
 Virgile Boumelaha – HJK – 2005
 Jean-Christophe Coubronne – FC Lahti – 2019–21
 Guy Gnabouyou – FC Inter – 2011–13, 2015–17
 Boussad Houche – IFK Mariehamn – 2010
 Dimitry Imbongo – FC Lahti – 2020
 Guy Moussi – HJK – 2015
 Armand Oné – TPS – 2007–08
Jordan Sebban – KuPS – 2021
 Mohamadou Sissoko – RoPS, KTP – 2019, 2021
 Jean-Felix Somay – PS Kemi – 2018
 Noam Surrier – FC Lahti – 2004

Gabon  

 Gaëtan Missi Mezu – Ilves – 2020

Gambia  

 Dawda Bah – HJK, KuPS, MyPa – 2007–11, 2013–14
 Momodou Ceesay – PS Kemi – 2017
 Omar Colley – KuPS – 2013–14
 Abdoulie Corr – VPS – 2011
 Saihou Jagne – IFK Mariehamn – 2012
 Tijan Jaiteh – KuPS – 2016
 Modou Jallow – AC Oulu – 2007
 Ousman Jallow – HJK – 2015–17
 Abdou Jammeh – RoPS – 2015–16
 Foday Manneh – HIFK – 2019–20
 Abdoulie Mansally – PS Kemi, FC Inter – 2017–18
 Sainey Nyassi – RoPS – 2014
 Mamut Saine – RoPS – 2016
 Lamin Samateh – KuPS – 2014
 Cherno Samba – FC Haka – 2008
 Demba Savage – FC Honka, HJK – 2008–15, 2017–21
 Ebrima Sohna – KuPS, VPS – 2012, 2014–15, 2017

Georgia  

 Zakaria Beglarishvili – SJK – 2019
 Giorgi Khidasheli – FF Jaro – 2011
 Giorgi Nikuradze – KTP – 2004–05
 Giorgi Ositashvili – KTP – 2015
 Irakli Sirbiladze – FF Jaro, FC Inter, KuPS – 2011–15
 Gocha Tkebuchava – Ilves – 1992–93 ( when active)
 Zurab Tsiskaridze – RoPS – 2020

Germany  

 Berkan Algan – FC Haka – 2001
 David Azin – FF Jaro – 2013
 Daniel Bauer – RoPS – 2008
 Thomas Dähne – HJK – 2015–17
 Hendrik Großöhmichen – FC Lahti – 2012 
 Tillmann Grove – FF Jaro – 2009–11
 Sasko Gulewski – FC Kuusysi – 2005
 Hendrik Helmke – IFK Mariehamn, FF Jaro, KPV – 2011, 2013–14, 2017–19
 Martin Kompalla – VPS, RoPS – 2019–20
 Adrian Pelka – RoPS – 2005
 Patrick Rakovsky – FC Lahti – 2019–20

Ghana  

 Sulley Abdallah – TPV – 1999
 Seth Ablade – KuPS – 2005–06
Mohammed Abubakari – IFK Mariehamn – 2021
 David Addy – Ilves – 2019
 Samuel Afum – Ilves – 2019
 Thomas Agyiri – TPS, Ilves, KTP – 2013–14, 2017, 2021
 Edmund Akro-Mensah – FC Honka – 2020–
 Masahudu Alhassan – TPS – 2020
 Felix Ankamah – KTP – 2004
 Anthony Annan – HJK, FC Inter – 2014, 2016–18, 2019–21
Clinton Antwi – KuPS – 2022–
 Jude Arthur – SJK – 2019–
 Reuben Ayarna – Ilves, SJK, KuPS – 2016–19
 Gideon Baah – FC Honka, HJK – 2013–15, 2019
 Nasiru Banahene – FC Honka – 2019–
 Nana Boateng – KuPS – 2020–21
 Sampson Cudjoe – FC Honka – 2008
 David Davidson – KTP – 2007
 Glenn Gabriel – RoPS – 2017
 Richard Gadze – HJK – 2016
 Christian Gyan – TPS – 2008
 Raymond Gyasi – RoPS – 2020
 Baba Mensah – Ilves, IFK Mariehamn – 2017–20, 2022–
 Evans Mensah – HJK – 2016–19
 Michael Mensah – FC Jokerit, MyPa – 2003–04
 David Opoku – MyPa – 2012
 Ransford Osei – RoPS – 2016
 Quincy Osei – FC Haka – 2010
Eric Oteng – Ilves – 2021–
 Seth Paintsil – FF Jaro – 2015
 Isaac Shaze – KPV – 2019
 Ishmael Yartey – KPV, FC Haka – 2019, 2021

Grenada  

 Alex McQueen – VPS – 2018

Guinea  

 Demba Camara – FC Inter – 2013–15
 Sekou Camara – HJK – 2019
 Mohamed Fofana – MyPa, FC Lahti – 2006–10

Guinea-Bissau  

 Kaby – Kemi Kings – 2016
 Fromose Mendy – HJK – 2015

Guyana  

 Trayon Bobb – RoPS – 2013
 Walter Moore – FF Jaro – 2015

Haiti  

 Jems Geffrard – RoPS – 2018
 Regillio Nooitmeer – FC Haka – 2010–11

Hong Kong  

 David Williamson – TP-47 – 2005

Hungary  

 Gábor Árki – Mikkelin Palloilijat – 1994, 1996
 Balázs Balogh – KuPS – 2009–11
 Gábor Bardi – FC Lahti – 2002
 Ferenc Bene – FC Jazz – 2000
 Bertalan Bicskei – TPV – 1999
 Levente Bozsik – KTP – 2003
 Krisztián Budovinszky – FC Haka – 2000
 Sándor Csató – Mikkelin Palloilijat – 1993
 Zoltán Czipó – Atlantis FC, AC Allianssi – 2001–03
 Gyula Dobesch – Ilves – 1992
 László Emmer – FC Jazz – 1991
 György Fabulya – Mikkelin Palloilijat – 1994
 László Fekete – HJK, RoPS – 2001–04
 Zsolt Grezsák – TPV – 1999
 Tamás Gruborovics – KuPS, KTP, IFK Mariehamn, JJK, FC Inter – 2005–06, 2008–15
 Tibor Gruborovics – Mikkelin Palloilijat – 1990–95
 Sándor Halász – TPV – 1999
 István Hámori – FC Lahti – 2000–02
 Atilla Herédi – FC Haka – 1990
 Sándor Jenei – HJK – 1993
 Tibor Kalina – FC Haka – 1998
 György Katona – FC Haka – 1990–94
 György Kajdy – TPS, Mikkelin Palloilijat – 1991–92, 1994
 István Kasza – FC Lahti – 2000
 Norbert Kerényi – RoPS – 2004
 Béla Kovács – VPS – 2002
 Péter Kovács – FC Lahti, FC Haka – 1999–2002
 Antal Lőrincz – FC Jazz – 1999
 Sándor Matus – KTP – 1999
 László Medgyesi – FC Lahti – 2001
 István Mitring – MyPa, KuPS – 1999–2003, 2005
 József Nyikos – FC Lahti – 2000
 József Ördög – FC Jazz – 2000
 László Pálfi – MyPa – 2001–02
 Zsolt Petry – KTP – 2000
 Atilla Plókai – Tampere United – 2000
 Róbert Rácz – AC Allianssi – 2003
 László Répási – TPV – 1999
 Lajos Schróth – FC Haka – 1992
 Antal Simon – FC Lahti, TPV – 1999
 Viktor Szentpéteri – FC Lahti, KuPS – 2008–09, 2012–13
 Mihály Szeróvay – JJK, FC Haka – 2009–10, 2012
 Gábor Szilágyi – FC Jokerit, HJK, KTP, TPS – 2000–01, 2003–06
 István Tarlósi – FC Hämeenlinna – 2002–04
 Krisztián Timár – FC Jokerit – 2003
 Tamás Udvari – MyPa – 2000
 Ernő Varga – FC Hämeenlinna – 2002–04
 András Vilnrotter-Babócsy – FC Haka, HJK – 1998–2004

Ireland  

 Travis Binnion – IFK Mariehamn – 2008
 Shane McFaul – FC Haka, KTP – 2012, 2015
 Shane Robinson – FC Haka – 2011–12

Italy  

 Giuseppe Funicello – IFK Mariehamn, VPS, FF Jaro – 2010–11, 2013
 Alessandro Marzuoli – VPS – 2010
 Marco Privitera – VPS – 2018

Ivory Coast  

 Charles Bantanga – VPS – 2015
 Jean-Jacques Bougouhi – HJK – 2017
 Hamed Coulibaly – KuPS, IFK Mariehamn – 2015, 2017–18
 Adama Fofana – HIFK – 2020
 Tiemoko Fofana – Ilves – 2018–20
Vigori Gbe – Ilves, FC Haka – 2021–
 Cédric Gogoua – SJK – 2014–15
 Didier Kadio – FF Jaro, SJK – 2015, 2018–19
 Koffi Roméo Konan – MyPa – 2007
 Mamadou Konate – AC Oulu – 2007
 Abdoulaye Méïté – FC Honka, SJK – 2013, 2016
 Muhamed Tehe Olawale – TPS, IFK Mariehamn – 2020–21
 Konan Oussou – HJK – 2014
 Zézéto – FF Jaro – 2010–11

Jamaica  

 Alanzo Adlam – IFK Mariehamn – 2013
 Andre Clennon – VPS – 2015–17
 Craig Foster – IFK Mariehamn – 2013
 Marcus Gayle – KuPS – 1990
 Hughan Gray – VPS – 2015
 Ricardo Morris – VPS – 2019
 Steven Morrissey – VPS – 2011–19, 2022–
 Dever Orgill – IFK Mariehamn – 2013–16
 Akeem Priestley – RoPS – 2013
 Yannick Salmon – MyPa – 2013
 Keithy Simpson – VPS – 2014
 Tremaine Stewart – RoPS – 2015
 O’Brian Woodbine – VPS, HJK – 2011–12

Japan  

 Mike Havenaar – HJK – 2015
 Taiki Kagayama – KPV, FC Inter – 2019–21
 Fugo Segawa – RoPS – 2018
 Atomu Tanaka – HJK – 2015–17, 2020–

Kazakhstan  

 Ilya Fomichev – TP-47, AC Oulu – 2004, 2007
 Igor Safonov – RoPS – 1996–97
 Anton Shokh – RoPS – 1993

Kenya  

 Anthony Dafaa – VPS, IFK Mariehamn – 2013–17
 Amos Ekhalie – IFK Mariehamn – 2007–12, 2014–19
 Clifton Mihseo – VPS – 2015
 Willis Ochieng – IFK Mariehamn – 2007–10
 Peter Opiyo – FF Jaro, SJK – 2014–15, 2018
 Arnold Origi – HIFK – 2019–20

Kosovo  

 Albinot Bekaj – FC Honka – 2014
 Arsim Gashi – IFK Mariehamn – 2009 (born in )
 Yll Hoxha – TPS – 2009 (also citizen of )
 Bajram Nebihi – FC Inter – 2016
 Kushtrim Rama – TPS – 2005
 Valdrin Rashica – FC Lahti – 2020
 Anel Rashkaj – SJK – 2020
 Lum Rexhepi – FC Honka, HJK, KuPS – 2011–14, 2016, 2018
Arlind Sejdiu – FC Honka, FC Lahti – 2019–
 Ymer Xhaferi – AC Oulu, FF Jaro, MyPa, PK-35 Vantaa – 2007, 2010–11, 2016
Altin Zeqiri – FC Lahti – 2019–

Kyrgyzstan  
 Edgar Bernhardt – VPS, FC Lahti, FF Jaro – 2010–12, 2014

Latvia  

 Janis Ikaunieks – KuPS – 2021–
Aleksandr Jelisejevs – FC Hämeenlinna – 2004
 Aleksandrs Roslovs – FC Hämeenlinna – 2003–04
 Ilia Scanicins – FC Hämeenlinna – 2003–04
 Juris Sevlakovs – Ilves – 1991, 1993 ( while active)
 Igors Tarasovs – KuPS – 2020

Lebanon  

 Mohamad Kdouh – Ilves – 2015

Liberia  

 Abel Gebor – FC Honka – 2014
Sylvanus Nimely – Ilves – 2021–

Liechtenstein  

 Dennis Salanović – AC Oulu – 2021–

Lithuania  

 Darius Magdisauskas – TP-Seinäjoki – 1997
 Deivydas Matulevičius – KuPS – 2018
 Viktoras Olsanskis – FC Haka – 1996

Mali  

 Adama Tamboura – FC Inter – 2016
 Ben Traoré – FC Haka – 2010

Martinique  

 Julien Faubert – FC Inter – 2017

Mexico  

 Jerónimo Amione – FC Lahti – 2019
 Daniel Antúnez – FC Inter – 2010, 2012
 Marco Bueno – HJK – 2019
 Dárvin Chávez – SJK – 2020
 Javier Paniaqua – TPS – 1994
 Alberto Ramírez – FC Inter – 2009
 José Manuel Rivera – FF Jaro – 2015

Moldova  
 Petru Racu – MyPa – 2008
Victor Sevcenco – PS Kemi – 2018

Montenegro  

 Saša Jovović – Kemi Kings, KuPS, JJK – 2016–17
 Zeljko Lekovic – HJK – 1996 ( while active)
 Boris Lucic – FF Jaro – 2006
 Drago Milović – TPS – 2018
 Miloš Milović – FC Honka – 2014
 Sasa Skara – HJK – 1996 ( while active)
 Boris Tatar – FC Lahti – 2016
 Milorad Zecevic – FF Jaro – 1998 ( while active)

Morocco  

 Hafid Salhi – FC Lahti – 2014

Namibia  
 Oliver Risser – KuPS – 2010

Netherlands  

 Martijn Abbenhuës – FC Jokerit – 2001
 Erik Bakker – FC Honka – 2019
 Pim Bouwman – FC Inter – 2012–13
 Robin Buwalda – IFK Mariehamn – 2019–21
 Hans Denissen – FC Haka – 2009
 Stef Doedée – FC Inter – 2012
 Patrick End – KuPS – 2001
 Jordi van Gelderen – JJK, KTP – 2012–13, 2015
 Hans Gillhaus – FF Jaro – 1998
 Guillano Grot – FC Inter – 2008–10
 Danny Hoesen – HJK – 2010
 Jos Hooiveld – FC Inter – 2007–08
Kevin Jansen – FC Honka – 2022–
 Tarik Kada – RoPS – 2019
 Dave Kastelein – TPV – 1999
 Rick Ketting – IFK Mariehamn, FC Inter – 2019–21
 Daan Klinkenberg – FC Inter, HIFK – 2019, 2022–
Youri Loen – FC Haka – 2021
 Martin Reynders – FC Jokerit, FC Haka – 1999–2000
 Patrick Samba – VPS – 2006
Fabian Serrarens – HJK – 2022–
 Kevin Tano – PS Kemi – 2017–18
Ingo van Weert – KTP – 2021
 Nathaniel Will – RoPS – 2017

New Zealand  

 Nikko Boxall – VPS, KuPS, SJK – 2015–17, 2020–21
 Kris Bright – FC Haka, IFK Mariehamn – 2012–13
 Gerard Davis – Tampere United – 2002
 Dean Dodds – Tampere United – 2000
 Raf de Gregorio – FC Jokerit, HJK – 2003–05
 Noah Hickey – Tampere United – 2001–03
 Chris James – Tampere United, KuPS – 2008–09, 2012–13
 Lee Jones – Tampere United – 2000–02
Logan Rogerson – FC Haka – 2021–
 Adrian Webster – MyPa, KuPS – 2008

Niger  

 Yusif Moussa – Ilves – 2019–20, 2022–

Nigeria  

 Aliyu Abubakar – KuPS, PS Kemi – 2016, 2018
 Adeneiyi Agbejule – VPS – 2001
 Taiye Ajiye – PS Kemi – 2018
Hope Akpan – SJK – 2021
 Ndukaku Alison – RoPS – 2013–14
 Jeremiah Ani – RoPS – 2009
 Obiora Aniche – HJK – 1995–97
 Edward Anyamkyegh – KuPS – 2005
 Samuel Ayorinde – FF Jaro – 1997
 Bola – Ponnistus – 1995
 Yero Bello – Ilves – 2016
 Dominic Chatto – FC Inter – 2007–08
 Francis Chibuike – KuPS – 2014–15
 Samuel Chidi – FC Haka – 2020–21
 Macauley Chrisantus – HJK – 2018
 Dudu – KuPS, FC Honka – 2010–13
 Osahon Eboigbe – VPS – 2010
 Philip Edeipo – RoPS – 2008
 Raphael Edereho – RoPS, AC Oulu, VPS – 2005, 2007–08
 Daniel Osinachi Egwim – FC Inter – 2010–11, 2014
 Azubuike Egwueke – KuPS – 2016–17
 Elderson – HJK – 2019
 Kennedy Eriba – TPS – 2012–13
 Emeka Eze – RoPS – 2017
 Iyam Friday – AC Oulu – 2007
 Reuben Gabriel – KuPS – 2017–18
Chinedu Geoffery – FC Lahti – 2021–
 Michael Ibiyomi – RoPS – 2015
 Bright Igbinadolor – FC Jokerit – 2001
Kennedy Igboananike – IFK Mariehamn – 2021
 Segun Ikudehinbu – KuPS – 2009
 Abdullahi Ishaka – FC Haka – 2008
 Abonima Izuegbu – SJK – 2016
 Augustine Jibrin – VPS – 2012
 Sani Kaita – RoPS – 2017
 Emenike Mbachu – RoPS, Ilves – 2013–15
 Philip Njoku – FC Inter – 2015–17
 Dickson Nwakaeme – KuPS – 2009–11
 Kennedy Nwanganga – FC Inter – 2009–10, 2016
 Harrison Nwanyanwu – KuPS – 2006
 Daniel Chimezie Nwoke – Tampere United – 2007–08
 Jude Nworuh – Ilves – 2017
 Faith Obilor – FC Inter, RoPS, HJK – 2012–19
 Paul Obiefule – KuPS – 2012
 Nnamdi Oduamadi – HJK – 2016
 Jerome Ogbuefi – KuPS – 2010
Michael Ogungbaro – KTP – 2021
 Obinna Okafor – KTP – 2008
 Dennis Okaru – TPS – 2011–14
 Echiabhi Okodugha – KuPS, RoPS, IFK Mariehamn – 2008–11
 Frankline Okoye – IFK Mariehamn – 2020–21
 Samuel Olabisi – RoPS – 2019–20
 Ojembe Olatuga – PK-35 Vantaa – 2016
 Azubuike Oliseh – FC Jokerit – 2001
 Gomo Onduku – Ilves – 2018
 Paul Onobi – KuPS – 2016
 Vincent Onovo – FC Inter, HJK – 2014–17
Lucky Opara – AC Oulu – 2021
 Gbolahan Salami – KuPS – 2016–17
 Usman Sale – KuPS, AC Oulu – 2020–21
 Soga Sambo – FC Inter – 2008
 Victor Raymond Solomon – VPS – 2007
 Taye Taiwo – HJK, RoPS – 2015–16, 2018–19
 Raphael Udah – KuPS – 2009–11
 Aniekpeno Udoh – KuPS – 2020–21
 Henry Ugwunna – Ilves – 2015
 Akombo Ukeyima – IFK Mariehamn – 2008
Henry Uzochukwu – KuPS – 2021–22
Izunna Uzochukwu – FC Honka – 2021
 Olajide Williams – KuPS, MyPa – 2010–13
 Babatunde Wusu – TPS, JJK, KTP – 2003–04, 2009–13, 2015

North Macedonia  

 Betim Aliju – KuPS – 2009
 Ylber Aliu – VPS – 2000
 Shkumbin Arslani – JJK – 2009
 Toni Banduliev – AC Oulu – 2007
 Egzon Belica – FC Inter – 2015–16
 Husein Demiri – PS Kemi – 2018
 Ferhan Hasani – HJK – 2020
 Gjorgji Hristov – JJK – 2009
 Demir Imeri – PS Kemi – 2018
 Filip Ivanovski – RoPS, KPV – 2018–19
 Nebi Mustafi – FC Haka, MyPa – 2006–09
 Calvin N’Sombo – PK-35 Vantaa – 2016
 Sakir Redzepi – FC Honka – 2014
 Artim Šakiri – FC Inter – 2006
 Marko Simonovski – FC Lahti – 2017
 Damjan Siskovski – FC Lahti, RoPS – 2018–19 
 Davor Taleski – FC Honka – 2018

Northern Ireland  

 Roy Essandoh – VPS – 1998–2000
Jake Dunwoody – HIFK, SJK – 2021–
 Tennant McVea – FC Lahti – 2010

Norway  

 Jacob Dunsby – HIFK – 2019
 Ahmed El-Amrani – FC Honka – 2018
 Mats Haakenstad – KuPS – 2020
 Mahmod Hejazi – FF Jaro – 2006
 Saibou Keita – FC Haka – 2020 
 Roger Lange – VPS – 1998
 Gunnar Norebö – VPS – 1998
 Joachim Osvold – TPS, KuPS – 2014–15
 Harmeet Singh – HJK – 2019
 Ole Talberg – FF Jaro – 2002
 Tobias Vibe – HIFK – 2019
 Rune Warholm – MyPa – 1997

Papua New Guinea  

 David Browne – HJK – 2020–

Paraguay  

 Isidro Leguizamón – MyPa – 2006

 Hugo Miranda – MyPa, FC Lahti, FF Jaro – 2005–08, 2010, 2013

Peru  

 Josef Chávez – FC Haka – 2009–11
 Héctor Takayama – FC Jazz – 2000–01
 Benito Yllaconza – FC Haka – 2010

Philippines  

 Oskari Kekkonen – FC Lahti, KTP – 2017–18, 2021
Amin Nazari – IFK Mariehamn – 2018

Poland  

 Andrzej Ambrozej – RoPS – 1990
 Tomasz Arceusz – VPS – 1995–96
 Cezary Baca – VPS – 1996–97
 Grzegorz Bala – RoPS – 2000
 Kazimierz Buda – VPS – 1995–96
 Piotr Burlikowski – RoPS – 2001
 Marek Czakon – Ilves – 1990–91
 Krzysztof Gawara – FF Jaro, TPV – 1991–95
 Robert Jadczak – RoPS – 2001
 Rafal Kaczor – RoPS – 2001
 Marek Krynski – RoPS – 1999, 2001
 Grzegorz Kubica – FC Jazz – 2001
 Dariusz Marzec – TPV, FC Jazz – 1999, 2001
 Marcin Pachowicz – AC Allianssi – 2003
 Jacek Perzyk – RoPS, VPS – 1994–96, 1999
 Janusz Pruchenski – FF Jaro – 1998
 Kazimierz Putek – FC Jazz – 1991
 Josef Robakiewicz – Mikkelin Palloilijat – 1992
 Robert Rogan – RoPS – 2000
 Tomasz Sajdak – HJK – 2008
 Mariusz Sawa – RoPS – 2001
 Michal Slawuta – FC Haka, FC Lahti – 2002–07, 2011
 Maciej Truszczynski – VPS – 2008
 Zbigniew Wachowicz – RoPS – 2000
 Grzegorz Wagner – TPV – 1999
Rafal Wolsztynski – SJK – 2021–
 Wieslaw Wraga – OTP, FC Oulu – 1990–92
 Piotr Zajaczkowski – FF Jaro, VPS – 1998, 2000

Portugal  

 Babacar Djaló – HJK – 2020–
Sandro Embaló – AC Oulu – 2022–
Rafael Floro – AC Oulu – 2022–
 Wato Kuaté – RoPS – 2018
 André Martins – IFK Mariehamn – 2010
 Rui Modesto – FC Honka – 2020–
 Bruno Rodrigues – KuPS – 2020
 Luis Santos – MyPa – 1993
 Nuno Tomás – KuPS – 2020

Puerto Rico  

 Alex Oikkonen – MyPa – 2014

Romania  

 Ciprian Brighiu – TP-47 – 2004
 Dan Chilom – IFK Mariehamn – 2008
 Alexandru Marca – Tampere United – 2000
 Vasile Marchis – FC Jazz, Tampere United, MyPa – 2002–07
David Popa – AC Oulu – 2021
 Alexandru Udrea – RoPS – 2001
 Nicolae Vasile – PS Kemi – 2016

Russia  

 Mikhail Biryukov – MyPa – 1992–93 ( when active)
 Valeri Broshin – KuPS – 1992 ( when active)
 Dmitri Brovkin – AC Oulu – 2007
 Anatoli Bulgakov – TP-47, AC Oulu – 2004–05, 2007
 Aleksei Burdman – FC Kuusysi – 1995
 Igor Cheminava – KuPS – 2017
 Igor Danilov – KuPS – 1994
 Anatoli Davydov – Ponnistus – 1995
 Aleksandr Dovbnya – FC Haka – 2007–08
 Aleksey Eremenko Sr. – FF Jaro, HJK – 1991–97, 1999–2005 ( when active)
 Sergey Eremenko – FF Jaro, SJK, AC Oulu – 2014–15, 2019, 2021
 Aleksei Gulo – KTP – 1999–2000
 Valeri Glushakov – FC Kuusysi – 1991–94 ( when active) 
 Giorgi Gorozia – RoPS – 2018
 Aleksandr Halzov – Ilves – 1995
 Aleksandr Ivanov – TPS – 1991 ( when active)
 Oleg Ivanov – TPV, Ilves, FC Haka, KTP, FC Lahti, FC Hämeenlinna – 1993–96, 1998–2002
 Vasili Karataev – RoPS, HJK, TPV – 1991–95, 1997 ( when active)
 Almir Kayumov – KuPS – 1992 ( when active)
 Dmitri Klimov – KuPS – 2006
 Evgeni Kobozev – VPS – 2016
 Aleksandr Komov – KTP – 2003
 Aleksandr Kostin – Ilves – 1995
 Igor Kuznetshenkov – Mikkelin Palloilijat – 1996
 Sergey Leonov – KTP – 2000
 Aleksandr Mishchuk – Atlantis FC, AC Allianssi, TP-47 – 2001–04
 Pavel Nazimov – FC Lahti – 2017
 Sergey Neyman – MyPa – 1993
 Pavel Osipov – FC Lahti – 2016, 2018
 Aleksei Petrov – RoPS – 2000–01
 Valeriy Popovic – TPV, Ilves, FC Haka, HJK – 1993–96, 1998–2009
 Aleksey Prudnikov – FF Jaro – 1993
 Maksim Rudakov – HJK, FC Honka – 2018–19, 2022–
 Evgeni Smirnov – MyPa, KuPS – 1999–2002
 Dmitriy Sokolov – TPS – 2003
 Ivan Solovjev – FC Lahti – 2016
 Vladimir Stroganov – VPS, Ilves – 1995–96
 Ivan Tarasov – HJK – 2019
 Evgeni Titov – Ilves – 1994
 Denis Tumasyan – FF Jaro – 2004–05
 Ilya Vaganov – FF Jaro – 2011–12, 2014–15
 Maksim Vasiljev – FF Jaro – 2010–12
 Aleksandr Vasyutin – FC Lahti – 2016–18
 Aleksandr Verinzhnikov – RoPS – 1992 ( when active)
 Denis Volodin – MyPa, FC Jazz, TP-47 – 2000–04
 Aleksandr Vorobjov – FF Jaro – 1993
 Maksim Votinov – MyPa – 2009–2011
 Artem Vyatkin – FC Lahti – 2018
 Aleksey Zhukov – RoPS – 2000

Saint Vincent and the Grenadines  
 Cornelius Stewart – VPS, PS Kemi – 2014, 2016

Scotland  

 James Beattie – MyPa – 1993
 Stuart Callaghan – Finnairin Palloilijat – 1998
 Martyn Corrigan – FC Jokerit – 1999
 Robbie Crawford – IFK Mariehamn – 2019
 Gerry Creaney – TPV – 1999
 Brian Gilmour – FC Haka – 2008
 Grant Kerr – VPS – 2013
 Billy MacDonald – FF Jaro – 1998
 Graeme Morrison – TPV – 1999
 Craig Ramsay – KPV – 1990
 Grant Smith – HJK – 2007

Senegal  

 Abdoulaye Ba – Ilves – 2018
 Samba Benga – SJK – 2019
 Elhadji Ciss – VPS – 2018
 Bouna Coundoul – VPS – 2012
 Ali Dia – Finnairin Palloilijat – 1995
Diawandou Diagne – KTP – 2021
 Babacar Diallo – FC Inter, KuPS – 2011–13, 2015–16, 2019
 Babacar Diop – TPS – 2020
 Mamadou Diouf – Ilves – 2015
 El-Hadji Gana Kane – SJK, KPV – 2016, 2019
 Ibrahima Gueye – VPS – 2018
 Médoune Gueye – IFK Mariehamn – 2010
 Macoumba Kandji – HJK, FC Inter, FC Honka, FC Lahti – 2014–15, 2017–18, 2020–
 Yoro Ly – Ilves – 2016
 Papa Niang – FF Jaro – 2009–12
 Pape Sow – FC Inter – 2016
 Emile Paul Tendeng – Ilves, SJK, IFK Mariehamn – 2016–21
 Issa Thiaw – Ilves, KuPS – 2018–19

Serbia  

 Lulezim Avdija – RoPS – 2005 ( when active)
 Dragan Bajic – TPV, FC Haka – 1999–2001 ( when active)
 Zoran Bogesic – KTP, RoPS – 2003–05 ( when active)
 Dejan Brankovic – JJK – 2005 ( when active)
 Davor Celic – AC Oulu – 2010
 Budimir Djukic – HJK – 2004 ( when active)
 Dalibor Djuric – RoPS – 2004 ( when active)
 Milos Josimov – KPV – 2019
 Mihajlo Jovanovic – KuPS – 2001 ( when active)
 Velibor Kopunovic – Tampere United – 2005 ( when active)
 Srdjan Ladic – RoPS – 2005 ( when active)
 Slavko Mandic – RoPS – 2004 ( when active)
 Ratko Marijanovic – RoPS – 2004 ( when active)
 Mladen Milinković – FF Jaro – 1998 ( when active)
 Pavle Milosavljevic – SJK, Ilves – 2014–16
 Nenad Nonković – TPV – 1999 ( when active)
 Nemanja Obradovic – FC Honka – 2018
 Ivan Ostojic – HJK – 2020
 Zoran Peic – TP-47 – 2004 ( when active)
 Zeljko Savic – SJK, PS Kemi, FC Honka, TPS – 2014–16, 2018
 Srdjan Savicevic – TPV – 1999 ( when active)
 Dejan Srdic – TPV – 2005 ( when active)
 Ivan Tatomirovic – HJK, RoPS, IFK Mariehamn – 2016–18
 Nebojsa Tomic – KTP – 2003 ( when active)
 Aleksander Vasiljevic – HJK – 2005 ( when active)

Sierra Leone  

 Patrick Bantamoi – KuPS, FC Inter, RoPS – 2005–10, 2014
 Samuel Barlay – IFK Mariehamn – 2006, 2008
Kei Kamara – HIFK – 2021
 John Keister – HJK – 2006–07
 Mohamed Koroma – FC Haka – 2011–12
 Medo – KuPS, HJK, FC Haka – 2006–10, 2016, 2020
 Obi Metzger – FC Haka – 2011–12
 Kabba Samura – HJK – 2007
 Hassan Sesay – KuPS, FC Lahti, MyPa, HIFK – 2008, 2011–19
 Rodney Strasser – TPS – 2020

Slovakia  

 Mario Adamcik – KuPS – 2001
 Rudolf Matta – KuPS – 2001–03
 Michal Mravec – RoPS – 2016
 Robert Petrus – FC Kuusysi – 1995
 Vladimir Sykora – VPS – 1999
 Marian Takac – Lahden Reipas – 1990 ( when active)

Slovenia  

 Filip Valencic – PS Kemi, HJK, FC Inter – 2016–21

Somalia  

 Ahmed Said Ahmed – PK-35 Vantaa – 2016
 Hussein Mohamed – HIFK, FC Haka – 2019, 2021

South Africa  

 Yanga Baliso – IFK Mariehamn – 2020–
 Chad Botha – FC Inter, FF Jaro – 2004, 2007
 Ryan Botha – MyPa, FC Inter – 2002–04
 Grant Crawford – KuPS – 2003
 Cheyne Fowler – FC Haka, HJK, VPS – 2003–14
 Neathan Gibson – MyPa – 1998–2000
 Leroy Maluka – TPS – 2010–12, 2014
Darren Smith – FC Honka – 2021

South Korea  

 Kim Hyeon-kwan – JJK – 2009
 Kwon Jung-hyuk – RoPS, VPS – 2009–10
 Lee Ho-jin – JJK – 2009
 Nam Ik-kyung – JJK, FC Haka – 2009–10

Spain  

 Fran Álvarez – KTP – 2021
 Chema Antón – SJK – 2017
 Sergi Arimany – SJK – 2017
 Asier Arranz – KTP – 2021
 Diego Bardanca – SJK – 2017
 Jagoba Beobide – RoPS – 2019
 Pablo Couñago – FC Honka, PK-35 Vantaa – 2014, 2016
 Nando Cózar – HIFK – 2019
 Toni Doblas – HJK – 2014
 Jordan Domínguez – HJK – 2018
 Juanan Entrena – HIFK – 2021
 Juan Esnáider – KTP – 2021
 Martin Fernández – FC Honka – 2014
 Jose Galán – RoPS – 2016
 Héctor García – SJK – 2014
 Javi Hervás – FC Honka, FC Lahti – 2018–21
 Fernando Liñán – PK-35 Vantaa – 2016
 Sergio Llamas – RoPS – 2019
 Carlos López – SJK – 2014
 Borjas Martín – FC Honka – 2018–20
 Mateo Míguez – PK-35 Vantaa – 2016
 Aimar Moratalla – SJK – 2016
 Álvaro Muñiz – FC Inter – 2019–20
 Rubén Palazuelos – FC Honka – 2013
 Ibán Parra – Tampere United – 2000
 Carlos Portela – FC Honka, PK-35 Vantaa – 2014, 2016
 Josu Prieto – SJK, FC Lahti – 2014, 2019
 Antonio Reguero – RoPS, HJK, FC Lahti – 2016–
 Ricky – FC Jazz – 1998
Ruxi – AC Oulu, FC Inter – 2021–
Pipe Sáez – HIFK – 2021–
Alejandro Sanz – FC Inter – 2021
 Abel Suárez – FC Honka – 2019
 Francis Suárez – FC Inter – 2014
 Yerai Vilaboa – FC Honka, PK-35 Vantaa – 2014, 2016

Sudan  
 Patrick Peter – TPS – 2004

Suriname  

 Marciano Boumann – HJK, TP-Seinäjoki – 1997

Sweden  

 Alibek Aliev – FF Jaro – 2015
Filip Almström-Tähti – IFK Mariehamn – 2021
 Emil Andersson – IFK Mariehamn – 2013
 Pontus Åsbrink – IFK Mariehamn – 2018
 Anders Bååth – SJK – 2018
 Gustaf Backaliden – IFK Mariehamn, SJK – 2019–21
 Arash Bayat – IFK Mariehamn – 2008
 Ludwig Bergström – IFK Mariehamn – 2012
 David Carlsson – IFK Mariehamn, HJK, FF Jaro – 2005–08, 2014–15
 Johan Carlsson – IFK Mariehamn – 2005–10
 Admir Catovic – KuPS, VPS – 2014–15
 Hasan Cetinkaya – FC Jazz – 1999
 Örjan Engström – FF Jaro – 1998
 Björn Enqvist – VPS – 1999–2000
 Bobbie Friberg da Cruz – IFK Mariehamn – 2014–17
 Andreas Friman – IFK Mariehamn – 2008
 Mikael Göransson – VPS – 1999
 Anders Granberg – FF Jaro – 2002
 Kenneth Gustafsson – IFK Mariehamn – 2009
 Mats Gustafsson – FC Inter, IFK Mariehamn – 1997, 1999–2007
 Felix Gustavsson – JJK – 2017
 Tarik Hamza – IFK Mariehamn – 2019–2020
Philip Hellqvist – KuPS – 2021
 Björn Hofvendahl – MyPa, FC Lahti – 1998–99
 Olof Hvidén-Watson – KTP – 2008
 Josef Ibrahim – IFK Mariehamn – 2013–16
 Joakim Jensen – FC Inter, HJK – 1999–2005
 Daniel Johansson – IFK Mariehamn – 2007
 Robert Kjellin – FC Lahti – 2000
 Andreas Kristoffersson – FC Inter – 2000
 Erik Lantto – VPS – 2000
 Mathias Larsson – VPS – 1999
 Hampus Lönn – IFK Mariehamn – 2019
 Peter Magnusson – HJK – 2010
 Rickson Mansiamina – HIFK – 2016
 Nicklas Maripuu – IFK Mariehamn – 2018
 Daniel Norrmén – IFK Mariehamn – 2005–08
 Simon Nurme – IFK Mariehamn – 2012–14
 Marcus Olofsson – IFK Mariehamn – 2009–12
 Daniel Örlund – HJK – 2015
 Robin Östlind – IFK Mariehamn – 2012–14
 Cesar Pacha – FC Lahti, KuPS – 2001, 2003
 Alexandros Pappas – IFK Mariehamn – 2009
 Gabriel Petrovic – IFK Mariehamn – 2006, 2016–18
 Moses Reed – IFK Mariehamn – 2008
 Magnus Samuelsson – FC Lahti – 2002
 Erik Sandvärn – IFK Mariehamn – 2005–07
 Robbin Sellin – IFK Mariehamn – 2017
 Simon Silverholt – IFK Mariehamn – 2018–19
 Philip Sparrdal Mantilla – IFK Mariehamn – 2015–18
 Björn Stringheim – VPS – 1998–2000
Calle Svensson – IFK Mariehamn – 2021
 Jakob Tånnander – FC Haka, HJK – 2020–21
 Richard Teberio – FC Inter – 1999–2004
 Erik Törnros – PS Kemi, FC Lahti – 2016, 2019
 Sebastian Wiklander – IFK Mariehamn – 2005
 Mattias Wiklöf – IFK Mariehamn – 2008, 2012–13

Switzerland  

 Magnus Breitenmoser – AC Oulu – 2021–
Jean-Pierre La Placa – AC Allianssi – 2005
 Stefan Marinkovic – FC Inter – 2014

Togo  

 Kuami Agboh – MyPa – 2007–08
 Henritse Eninful – FC Lahti – 2020–21

Trinidad and Tobago  

 Danny Carr – RoPS – 2020
 Aubrey David – FF Jaro, PS Kemi, VPS – 2014, 2017–18
 Akil DeFreitas – FF Jaro – 2012
 Jamal Gay – RoPS – 2014
 Ataullah Guerra – RoPS – 2013
 Joevin Jones – HJK – 2014
 Stefan de Las – MyPa – 2010
Kareem Moses – VPS – 2022–
 Brent Sancho – MyPa – 1999
 Rundell Winchester – PS Kemi – 2016
 Shahdon Winchester – FF Jaro, SJK – 2013–14, 2018

Tunisia  
 Ady – TPS, MyPa – 2005–07, 2009–10

Turkey  

 Berkant Güner – VPS – 2018
 Senol Kök – FC Jokerit – 2001
 Ugur Özder – PS Kemi – 2018
 Fuat Usta – FC Jokerit – 2001
 Sükrü Uzuner – Finnairin Palloilijat, HJK, KTP, Atlantis FC – 1998–1999, 2001
 Kasim Yildiz – AC Allianssi – 2005

Uganda  

 Robert Kakeeto – HIFK – 2019
 Martin Mutumba – FC Inter – 2005–07
 Yunus Sentamu – Ilves – 2016

Ukraine  

 Andrei Adrosov – FC Oulu – 1994
Denys Balanyuk – IFK Mariehamn – 2021–
 Dmytro Bilonog – IFK Mariehamn – 2020
 Sergiy Bozhko – Ilves – 1994
 Denis Kostintshuk – VPS – 2002
 Igor Levchenko – IFK Mariehamn – 2018
 Roman Mirošnytšenko – TP-47 – 2004
 Denys Oliynyk – SJK – 2018–
 Serhii Omelianovitch – AC Allianssi – 2005
 Mykola Pavlenko – RoPS – 2008
 Dmytro Pronevych – IFK Mariehamn – 2009
 Igor Saveljev – FC Oulu – 1994
 Sergiy Shpak – FF Jaro – 2011
 Andriy Telesnenko – FC Oulu – 1992
 Irakli Tsykolia – AC Oulu, RoPS – 2007–08
 Dmytro Voloshyn – IFK Mariehamn – 2009–10
 Ruslan Zanevsky – FF Jaro – 2007

United States  

 Dion Acoff – SJK – 2019
 Freddy Adu – KuPS – 2015
 Mike Banner – FF Jaro – 2012–13
 Tristan Bowen – KuPS – 2015
 Joe Broekhuizen – VPS – 2015
 Jacob Bushue – FC Haka – 2020–21
 Alex De John – TPS – 2014
 Greg Eckhardt – VPS – 2010
 Christian Eissele – PS Kemi – 2016
 Brandon Fonseca – PK-35 – 1998
Ian Garrett – KTP – 2021
 Michael Hartmann – FC Haka – 2020
 Craig Hill – KTP, KuPS – 2015–16
 Macario Hing-Glover – HIFK – 2019–
 Will John – RoPS – 2015–16
 Stephen McCarthy – KuPS – 2015
 Justin Moose – SJK – 2014
 Tim Murray – FC Honka – 2018–21
 Lamar Neagle – IFK Mariehamn – 2010
 Tony Odorisio – KTP – 2008
 Jonathan Okafor – MyPa – 2013
 Tyler Ruthven – KuPS – 2013
 Kevin Sawchak – MyPa – 2011
 Isaiah Schafer – VPS – 2015
 Jordan Seabrook – FC Haka, VPS – 2012–15
 Luis Silva – FC Honka – 2019
 Johann Smith – KuPS – 2012
 Karsten Smith – VPS – 2013
 Lawrence Smith – VPS – 2009
 Brian Waltrip – Tampere United – 2000
 Josh Wicks – IFK Mariehamn – 2011

Uruguay  

 Luis Curbelo – TPS – 1996–97
 Facundo Guichón – SJK – 2017
 Álvaro Méndez – FC Jazz – 1997
 Pablo Muñiz – HJK – 2005
 César Pellegrin – RoPS – 2005
 Walter Surraco – TPS – 2005–06

Venezuela  

 Daniel Carrillo – KuPS – 2021–

Wales  

 John Allen – Mikkelin Palloilijat, RoPS, TPS, MyPa, TPV – 1990–99
 Richard Dorman – SJK – 2014–18
 Mark Joseph – Ilves – 1993–96
 Josh Pritchard – FC Honka – 2014

Zambia  

 Godfrey Chibanga – RoPS – 2009
 Jackson Chileshe – RoPS – 2008–09
 Dabid Chilufya – RoPS – 1998–2001
 George Chilufya – RoPS – 1990–2001, 2005
 Clive Hachilensa – IFK Mariehamn – 2007
 Kenny Katala – RoPS – 2001
 Stephen Kunda – RoPS – 2008–09
 Mordon Malitoli – RoPS – 1997–2001
 Christopher Musonda – RoPS – 2009
 Silvester Musonda – RoPS – 1998
 Chanda Mwaba – RoPS – 2008–09
 Nchimunya Mweetwa – RoPS – 2008–09
 Zeddy Saileti – RoPS – 1994–2001, 2004–05, 2008–09
 Musole Sakulanda – RoPS – 2001
 White Simwanza – RoPS – 2009
 Emmanuel Siwale – RoPS, TP-Seinäjoki – 1994–95, 1997
 Harrison Tembo – RoPS – 1997
 Dominic Yobe – AC Oulu – 2007, 2010
 Donewell Yobe – AC Oulu – 2010

Zimbabwe  

 Lucky Mkosana – IFK Mariehamn – 2017

Notes

References

Sources 
Veikkausliiga player archive 1990–2013
Finnish Football Association/Veikkausliiga

Finland
 
 
Association football player non-biographical articles